Jean Wauters (25 November 1906 – 15 April 1989) was a Belgian racing cyclist. He rode in the 1932 Tour de France.

References

1906 births
1989 deaths
Belgian male cyclists
Place of birth missing